Girolamo is an Italian variant of the name Hieronymus.  Its English equivalent is Jerome.

It may refer to:

 Girolamo Cardano (1501–1576), Italian Renaissance mathematician, physician, astrologer and gambler
 Girolamo Cassar (c. 1520 – after 1592), Maltese architect and military engineer
 Girolamo da Cremona (fl. 1451–1483), Italian Renaissance painter
 Girolamo della Volpaia, Italian clock maker
 Girolamo Fracastoro (1478–1553), Italian physician, scholar, poet and atomist
 Girolamo Frescobaldi (1583–1643), Italian musician
 Girolamo Maiorica (c. 1591–1656), Italian Jesuit missionary to Vietnam
 Girolamo Luxardo (1821–), Italian liqueur factory
 Girolamo Masci (1227–1292), Pope Nicholas IV (1288–1292)
 Girolamo Palermo, American mobster
 Girolamo Porro (c. 1520 – after 1604), Italian engraver
 Girolamo Riario (1443–1488), Lord of Imola and Forlì
 Girolamo Romani (1485–1566), Italian High Renaissance painter 
 Girolamo Savonarola (1452–1498), Italian Dominican priest and leader of Florence
 Girolamo Tiraboschi (1731–1794), Italian literary critic
 Girolamo da Treviso (1508–1544), Italian Renaissance painter
 Girolamo Zanchi (1516–1590), Italian Protestant Reformation clergyman and educator
 Girolamo Zenti (1609– 1666), Italian harpsichord maker

See also 

 San Girolamo (disambiguation)

Italian masculine given names